The NBA Sportsmanship Award is an annual National Basketball Association (NBA) award given to a player who most "exemplifies the ideals of sportsmanship on the court with ethical behavior, fair play, and integrity." It is directly analogous to the Kim Perrot Sportsmanship Award, which has been awarded by the NBA's sister league, the WNBA, with neither award demanding excellence of play.

Every year, each of the 30 NBA teams nominates one of its players to compete for this award. From these nominees, one player from each NBA division are selected by a panel as the divisional Sportsmanship Award winners. At the end of the regular season, players in the league cast votes for the award, with eleven points given for each first-place vote, nine for second-place vote, seven points for third, five points for fourth, three points for fifth and one point for each sixth place vote received. The player with the highest point total, regardless of the number of first-place votes, wins the award and presented with the Joe Dumars Trophy, named after the former Detroit Pistons player and the award's inaugural recipient.

Grant Hill and Mike Conley have won the award three times; the most in NBA history. Kemba Walker and Jason Kidd have both won it twice.

Winners

Multi-time winners

Teams

See also

Notes

References

External links

Sportsmanship
National Basketball Association lists
Awards established in 1996
Sportsmanship trophies and awards